Suraj Revanna is an Indian politician and physician who is serving as a Member of Karnataka Legislative Council from Hassan district. His political party is the Janata Dal (Secular).

Personal life 
He was born on 1 January 1988. He is the son of H. D. Revanna, MLA, and the grandson of H. D. Deve Gowda, Prime Minister of India. Former Chief Minister of Karnataka, H. D. Kumaraswamy is his uncle, and Suraj's younger brother, Prajwal Revanna ,is a member of the 17th Lok Sabha from the Hassan Constituency.

He received his postgraduate degrees from Rajiv Gandhi University of Health Science in MBBS and MS (General Surgery) (May 2015) and has been elected as director of Hassan District Cooperative Central Bank (HDCC).

Political career     
Suraj Revanna has submitted his paperwork for the MLC election to Hassan's local bodies on November 19. This marks the entry of the 8th member of the Gowda family into politics. His victory in the elections to the Karnataka Legislative Council has set a new record in electoral politics. Now, the first family of the JD(S) has a presence in all four Houses of the legislature. His grandfather, a former PM, H. D. Deve Gowda. is a member of the Rajya Sabha. His younger brother, Prajwal Revanna, an engineering graduate, was elected to Lok Sabha in 2019 to represent Hassan. His father, H.D. Revanna, a former minister representing the Holenarsipur constituency in the State Assembly, and his mother, Bhavani Revanna, a Hassan Zilla Panchayat member, Besides these four, two more members of the family—H.D. Kumaraswamy and Anita Kumaraswamy—are members of the State Assembly. He secured 2,281 votes of the total 3,478 votes polled.

References 

1988 births
Living people